The Transhumanist Bill of Rights is a crowdsourced document that conveys rights and laws to humans and all sapient entities while specifically targeting future scenarios of humanity. The original version was created by transhumanist US presidential candidate Zoltan Istvan and was posted by Zoltan on the wall of the United States Capitol building on December 14, 2015.

History 
In act reminiscent of Martin Luther, Zoltan Istvan was filmed writing the Transhumanist Bill of Rights on steps of the US Supreme Court on December 13, 2015. The following day, while being surrounded and warned by Capitol police he was going to be arrested for trespassing, Zoltan posted the one-page bill to the northside wall of the US Capitol, an act which is partially documented in the documentary Immortality or Bust. The bill quickly fell off the building.  
 
Version 2.0 was published in Wired magazine by Bruce Sterling. By the time Version 3.0 was published in December 2018, the document had quadrupled in size from version 1.0. Versions 2.0 and 3.0 were developed using electronic ranked-preference voting that involved the members of the U.S. Transhumanist Party proposing articles and then selecting among the proposed wordings.

Istvan has spoken about the bill at the World Economic Forum (Global Council Meeting),  Congreso Futuro, the World Bank, and the US Navy.

Content 
The most current version of the Transhumanist Bill of Rights focuses protecting the rights of: Human beings; genetically modified humans beings; cyborgs; digital intelligences; intellectually enhanced, previously non-sapient animals; any species of plant or animal which has been enhanced to possess the capacity for intelligent thought; and other advanced sapient life forms. The section on morphological freedom has received particular attention in both the press and scholarly literature. 

The Transhumanist Bill of Rights has been widely discussed - major media has published information on it, books have discussed it, and academics have written papers about it. Its 43 articles cover items such as the right to abolish all suffering, the right for morphological freedom, the right to universal basic income and healthcare, the right to strive for radical life extension, and the legal requirement for sentient entities to protect themselves against existential risk. To help guard against existential risk and ensure a bright future for humanity article 5 of the bill mandates that governments "take all reasonable measures to embrace and fund space travel". The bill also requires aging to be classified as a disease by all governments.

Criticism 
In an article at The American Spectator titled a “A Transhumanist Bill of Wrongs” perennial transhumanist critic Wesley Smith argued that the laws in the Transhumanist Bill of Rights would cost too much and harm human exceptionalism.  Dr. Michael Cook questions why transhumanists even need a bill of rights, and, instead, asks whether society would need a bill of rights against transhumanists and their goals. When critiquing Version 2.0 of the Bill, Michael Cook along with commentator Jasper Hammill of The Metro erroneously assumed that when Article IV references a right to "ending involuntary suffering", it was referring to euthanasia. As U.S. Transhumanist party chair Gennady Stolyarov II has explained, no such implication was implied and the text is actually a reference to David Pearce’s idea that suffering itself should be abolished for entities who desire this, as expressed in his philosophy of abolitionism.

Text of Version 1.0

References

External links 
 Version 1.0
 Version 2.0
 Version 3.0 

Transhumanism
Transhumanist politics